Rick Willis (born February 4, 1966) is an American college administrator and former football, baseball, and softball coach. He was the athletic director at Wartburg College in Waverly, Iowa, from rom 2005 to 2021, before transitioning to vice president for student recruitment. Willis served two stints as the head football coach at Wartburg, from 1997 to 2005 and again from 2008 to 2021, compiled a record of 185–46. He was succeeded in 2021 by his former player and defensive coordinator Chris Winter. He was the head baseball coach at Wittenberg University in Springfield, Ohio from 1991 to 1996, amassing a record of 150–85. Willis also coached the softball team at Wartburg for one season, in 2003, tallying a mark of 38–10 and reaching the Division III Women's College World Series.

Willis was born in Camanche, Iowa. He attended Cornell College in Mount Vernon, Iowa, where he played football and baseball, earning all-conference honors in both sports.

Head coaching record

Football

Baseball

Softball

References

External links
 Wartburg administrative profile
 Wartburg football profile

1966 births
Living people
American football defensive backs
American softball coaches
Baseball second basemen
Cornell Rams baseball players
Cornell Rams football players
Illinois Fighting Illini football coaches
Wartburg Knights athletic directors
Wartburg Knights football coaches
Wittenberg Tigers baseball coaches
Wittenberg Tigers football coaches
Wartburg Knights softball coaches
University of Illinois Urbana-Champaign alumni
People from Clinton County, Iowa
Coaches of American football from Iowa
Players of American football from Iowa
Baseball coaches from Iowa
Baseball players from Iowa